Silja is a feminine given name used in the Nordic countries and Germany. The Danish/Norwegian equivalent is Silje.

In Finnish, it is a derived from the name Cecilia (of Saint Cecilia).

People
 Silja Walter (1919–2011), Swiss author
 Silja Vöneky (born 1969), German jurist
 Anja Silja (born 1940), German soprano
 Silja Känsäkoski (born 1997), Finnish swimmer
 Silja Lehtinen (born 1985), Finnish sailor
 Silja Suija (born 1974), Estonian cross-country skier
 Silja Kanerva (born 1985), Finnish sailor
 Silja Ekeland Bjørkly (born 1976), Norwegian politician
 Silja Kosonen (born 2002), Finnish hammer thrower
 Silja Tarvonen (born 1985), Finnish orienteering competitor
 Silja Dögg Gunnarsdóttir (born 1973), Icelandic politician

Companies

 Silja Line (originally just Silja), Finnish cruise shipping brand
 MS Silja Europa
 MS Silja Serenade
 MS Silja Symphony

References

German feminine given names
Finnish feminine given names
Swedish feminine given names
Icelandic feminine given names